Sandro Emanuel Anjos Barradas (born ) is a Portuguese futsal player who plays as a goalkeeper for Rio Ave. Sandro has been capped 24 times for the Portugal national team.

References

External links

Sandro Barradas at playmakerstats.com (formerly thefinalball.com)

1979 births
Living people
Sportspeople from Porto
Futsal goalkeepers
Portuguese men's futsal players
AR Freixieiro players